"Little Brown Jug" is a song written in 1869 by Joseph Eastburn Winner, originally published in Philadelphia with the author listed as Winner's middle name "Eastburn".

Background
It was originally a drinking song. It remained well known as a folk song into the early 20th century. Like many songs which make reference to alcohol, it enjoyed new popularity during the Prohibition era.

1939 Glenn Miller recording
In 1939, Glenn Miller and His Orchestra released a hit version of the song on RCA Bluebird, as an A side 78 single, B-10286-A, in a new arrangement by Bill Finegan backed with "Pavanne". The recording was an early chart hit for Glenn Miller. The song was performed in Glenn Miller's Carnegie Hall concert that year and became a staple of the Glenn Miller Orchestra repertoire,  and a classic of the Big Band era.

The personnel on the Glenn Miller recording: Saxes: Hal McIntyre, Tex Beneke, Wilbur Schwartz, Stanley Aronson, Al Klink; Trumpets: Bob Price, R. D. McMickle, Legh Knowles; Trombones: Glenn Miller, Paul Tanner, Al Mastren; Piano: Chummy MacGregor; String Bass: Rowland Bundock; Guitar: Allen Reuss; Drums: Moe Purtill.

The song was featured in and was central to the plot of the 1954 Universal Pictures film biography The Glenn Miller Story starring James Stewart and June Allyson. The Universal International Orchestra under the direction of Joseph Gershenson released a recording of the song from The Glenn Miller Story soundtrack as a single backed with "A String of Pearls" on Decca Records in the U.S. and on Brunswick Records in the UK in 1954.

Other versions

Subsequently, in 1947 it was recorded by the accordionist John Serry Sr. and the guitarist Tony Mottola with the noted Joe Biviano Accordion & Rhythm Sextette for Sonora records.

It was also sung by Carl "Alfalfa" Switzer and Harold "Slim" Switzer in an Our Gang (Little Rascals) short.

Lyrics
The song's lyrics are about a man and his wife and their hard life due to alcoholism. The tone and tune, however, are bright and cheerful, indicating the irony of the singer not knowing his degraded condition - due to alcohol. The first verse of the song is:

The Chorus of the song goes:

As a children's song, the lyrics are often changed. Sometimes a verse is modified to fit the melody and rhythm of the tune. In modern versions of the song, the language is often updated to eliminate the archaic second-person pronoun "thee" so that it reads:

In the 1948 Famous Studios Screen Song animated short titled "Little Brown Jug", a "bouncing ball" cartoon, it is sung with the music credited to Winston Sharples and entirely new lyrics by Buddy Kaye.

Other recordings
The song has been recorded by the following performers in addition to those listed above:

Joe Biviano, his Accordion and Rhythm Sextette including John Serry and Tony Mottola released a recording of the song as a 78 on Sonora Records. 
Arthur Godfrey released a version with lyrics on Crown Records accompanied by Archie Bleyer and his Orchestra. 
Art Van Damme released a version as a 78 on Capitol Records as 57-570. 
Louise Massey and the Westerneers released it as a Polka instrumental on Columbia as 20245. 
Lenny Dee released the song on Decca as an organ solo. 
John Kirby and his Orchestra released it on Okeh Records. 
Chubby Parker released "Little Brown Jug" as a 78 on Silvertone as 25013. 
Ken Griffin released the song on Rondo Records. 
Stuart Robertson released it on HMV. 
Phil Cardew and his Corn Huskers as a square dance on Parlophone.
Frank Crumit released it on HMV.
George Wade on RCA Victor as a square dance.
Bluebird Foreign Band on RCA Bluebird.
The Billy May Orchestra released the song on Capitol.
Uncle Josh in the cylinder record "Uncle Josh's Huskin' Bee" says after a few lines are sung from it, "I always liked that little brown jug".
The chorus lyrics are used in a modified form in the song "The Coral Room" by Kate Bush on the album Aerial, referring to a song her mother sang in the kitchen: "Little brown jug, don't I love thee/Ho ho ho, hee, hee, hee."

Popular culture
Teresa Ellen Talley adapted the tune into a commercial jingle for Dynamo laundry detergent in 1975 ("The Little Blue Jug Is Dynamo!").
The same melody was used for the song "My Ding-a-Ling" written by Dave Bartholomew, which became a Number 1 hit in 1972 for Chuck Berry.
In episode 1828 of Sesame Street, Grover delivers several singing telegrams to the tune of Little Brown Jug.
The song is included in every Casio electronic keyboards since the late 1990s, often in a swing arrangement.

References

External links
 
 UCSB cylinder audio archive:
 Brown wax home recording of Little brown jug, sung by mixed chorus, between 1890 and 1928
  Little brown jug, performed by The Blue Ridge Duo (Gene Austin and George Reneau), 1925

1869 songs
Drinking songs
Songs about alcohol
Fictional objects
Glenn Miller songs
1939 songs
Okeh Records singles